The Waycross Braves were a minor league baseball team located in Waycross, Georgia, United States. An affiliate of the Milwaukee Braves, they played in the Georgia–Florida League from 1956 to 1958 and in 1963. However the team began in 1939 with the name Waycross Bears.

Year-by-year record 

Defunct minor league baseball teams
Milwaukee Braves minor league affiliates
1939 establishments in Georgia (U.S. state)
1963 disestablishments in Georgia (U.S. state)
Baseball teams established in 1939
Sports clubs disestablished in 1963
Waycross, Georgia micropolitan area
Defunct baseball teams in Georgia
Baseball teams disestablished in 1963